The following television stations in the United States brand as channel 45 (though neither using virtual channel 45 nor broadcasting on physical RF channel 45):
 WKEF-DT2 in Dayton, Ohio
 KSTC-TV in Saint Paul, Minnesota

45 branded